Chyptodes is a genus of longhorn beetles of the subfamily Lamiinae, containing the following species:

 Chyptodes albosuturalis Fuchs, 1961
 Chyptodes dejeani (Thomson, 1865)

References

Lamiini